Don Carlo III di Tocco Cantelmo Stuart (4 April 1827 – 24 March 1884), or Carlo di Tocco for short, was a 19th-century Italian noble, serving as the Prince of Montemiletto and the titular Prince of Achaea from the death of his father Francesco di Tocco Cantelmo Stuart in 1877 to his own death in 1884. Carlo III di Tocco Cantelmo Stuart was the last living member of the Tocco family, which had once ruled the Despotate of Epirus. Carlo was prominent among the nobility of Italy, having held high honors in the Kingdom of the Two Sicilies until its fall in 1861 and thereafter becoming a leader figure among those who sought to restore it.

Biography 
Carlo III di Tocco Cantelmo Stuart was born in Naples on 4 April 1827, as the eldest son of Francesco di Tocco Cantelmo Stuart, Prince of Montemiletto and titular Prince of Achaea, and Maria Maddalena di Tocco Cantelmo Stuart. Francesco and Maria Maddalena were cousins. Upon his Francesco's death on 16 April 1877, Carlo inherited father's titles, including not only Montemiletto but also various other fiefs throughout Italy, and claims.

While the Kingdom of the Two Sicilies still existed, before its fall in 1861 and the transition of the Kingdom of Sardinia, which had conquered the Two Sicilies, into the Kingdom of Italy, Carlo was a high-ranking member of the nobility of the Two Sicilies. He had for instance in his youth been made a gentleman of the chamber by Ferdinand II of the Two Sicilies. Carlo also joined several orders of knighthood, becoming a Knight of Devotion within the Sovereign Military Order of Malta on 8 January 1873, and also joining the Sacred Military Constantinian Order of Saint George and the Order of St. Gregory the Great. After his father's death, Carlo rose to be considered a leader among the Bourbon legitimists who sought to restore the Kingdom of the Two Sicilies. Prior to his father's death, Carlo and his father had been implicated in the July 1861 failed conspiracy of Frisio, which had been aimed at provoking insurrection and occupying Naples in favor of the Bourbon dynasty. Both Carlo and Francesco were abroad at the time of the investigations, so the accusations against them amounted to nothing.

Carlo died unmarried and childless in Naples on 24 March 1884. With Carlo's death the Tocco family, which had originated eight or seven centuries prior and had once ruled the Despotate of Epirus, was rendered extinct. Carlo's titles were inherited by Carlo Capece Galeota, who was matrilineally descended from Carlo II di Tocco Cantelmo Stuart, Carlo III's grandfather.

Notes

References

Bibliography

Web sources 
 

1827 births
1884 deaths
Tocco family
Princes of Achaea
Lords of Italy